The Curse of Vererbung (German:Der Fluch der Vererbung) (The Curse of Heredity: Those Who Should Not Be Mothers) is a 1927 German silent film directed by Adolf Trotz and starring Marcella Albani, Maly Delschaft and Carl de Vogt.

The film's sets were designed by the art director Leopold Blonder.

Cast
 Marcella Albani as Olga  
 Maly Delschaft as Magda  
 Carl de Vogt as Dr. Münchow  
 Leopold von Ledebur as Hartmann. Olgas Mann  
 Alex Allin as Franz, sein Sohn  
 Fritz Kampers as Karl, sein zweiter Sohn  
 Georg John as Portier  
 Irma Green as Betty, Zofe  
 Frida Richard as Olgas Mutter  
 Carla Bartheel as Krankenschwester

References

Bibliography
 Rogowski, Christian. The Many Faces of Weimar Cinema: Rediscovering Germany's Filmic Legacy. Camden House, 2010.

External links

1927 films
Films of the Weimar Republic
Films directed by Adolf Trotz
German silent feature films
German black-and-white films